Martin Hudec (born 15 April 1982) is Czech football player who currently plays for VfL Osnabrück.

Career
His career started in the city of Znojmo in the club VTJ Znojmo. After successive loans to TuS Koblenz and FC Zbrojovka Brno in 2009 and 2010 respectively, he transferred to Karlsruher SC.

References

External links
 
 

1982 births
Living people
Czech footballers
Czech Republic under-21 international footballers
Czech First League players
SK Sigma Olomouc players
FC Zbrojovka Brno players
TuS Koblenz players
Karlsruher SC players
VfL Osnabrück players
2. Bundesliga players
3. Liga players
Expatriate footballers in Germany
Association football defenders
People from Znojmo
Sportspeople from the South Moravian Region